The Revered John Flitcroft (1914–1994) was a British cleric, academic and historian.

Career 
Flitcroft was educated at the University of Manchester, studying for his Bachelor of Arts (BA) and Master of Arts (MA) degrees in 1936 and 1937 respectively. He then studied at Bishops' College, Cheshunt before being ordained as a deacon in 1938 and later ordained as a priest in 1939. He was appointed to numerous livings during the war years and afterwards, before being appointed as lecturer in theology at the University of Manchester in 1954, which post he held until 1966. At the university he was also Warden of Hulme Hall, a Church of England hall of residence.
During this time, he was also an active Member of the Chetham Society, serving as Council Member from 1945 until 1971, and as Secretary from 1951 to 1964. He was appointed as an Honorary Curate of St Ann's Church, Manchester in 1954 and was later the Vicar of St Cuthbert's Church, Lytham from 1966 to 1979. He retired to Renfrewshire in 1979. He died in 1994.

References 

1914 births
1994 deaths
Clergy from Manchester
English historians
Chetham Society